Jamishan-e Olya may refer to:
 Jamishan-e Olya, Sahneh
 Jamishan-e Olya, Sonqor